Kauns is a tiny municipality in the district of Landeck in the Austrian state of Tyrol located about 12 km southeast of Landeck and 1 km below Kaunerberg at the upper course of the Inn River. Several fires have tortured the village; only a few houses survived the catastrophes.

References

External links

To travel back in time to 1968 in Kauns, Austria go to YouTube and access David Bullock Kauns Austria 1968.

Cities and towns in Landeck District